KGUA is a public radio station broadcasting out of Gualala, California.

History
KGUA went on the air on August 22, 2008.

See also
List of community radio stations in the United States

References

External links
 

Mendocino County, California
Public radio stations in the United States
GUA
Radio stations established in 2011
2011 establishments in California
Community radio stations in the United States